Our Lady of Late is the second album by Meredith Monk, released in 1973 through Minona Records.

Track listing

Personnel 
Musicians
Meredith Monk – vocals, percussion
Collin Walcott – percussion, production
Production
Gary Alper – engineering
Peter Moore – photography
Daniel Zellman – mixing, mastering

References

External links 
 

1973 albums
Meredith Monk albums